Nikola Maksimović (born 25 November 1991) is a Serbian professional footballer who plays as a centre-back.

Club career

Early career
Maksimović began his career with Kosmos Bajina Bašta, before moving to Sloga Bajina Bašta. He represented both clubs in youth competitions. Maksimović made his senior debut for Sevojno in the 2008–09 Serbian First League. He also played against FBK Kaunas and Lille in the 2009–10 UEFA Europa League.

In the summer of 2010, Sevojno merged with Sloboda Užice. On 19 September 2010, Maksimović received the first yellow card of his career during a match against Spartak Subotica, and scored the first goal of his professional career on 5 March 2011 in Lučani.

Red Star
During the 2012 winter transfer window, Maksimović was signed by Red Star Belgrade for a reported fee of 300,000€. He made his debut on 3 March 2012 in a match against Spartak Zlatibor.

At the end of the season, 51% of his contract was acquired by Cypriots Apollon Limassol.

Torino
On 23 July 2013, he was loaned to Italian Serie A club Torino with a buyout clause; he made his official debut on 6 October as a substitute against Sampdoria in Genoa, finishing 2–2. Over the course of the season he earned a spot in the starting lineup, first, as a central defender, then as a right-sided midfielder.

On 27 May 2014, Torino exercised the right to purchase him outright; Maksimović signed a contract until 2018.

Napoli
On 31 August 2016 he was transferred to Napoli on loan with obligation to buy. On 28 September 2016, Maksimović made his debut in 4–2 home victory over Benfica. On 23 October 2016, he scored his first goal in Serie A, in 2–1 away victory over Crotone.

Spartak
On 26 January 2018, he joined the Russian champions FC Spartak Moscow on loan until the end of the 2017–18 season.

Genoa
On 31 August 2021, Maksimović signed with Genoa for free.

International career
He made 4 appearances for the Serbian national youth teams: two with the under-19 and two with the under-21. He was first called up to the Serbian national team on 31 May 2012, for two friendly matches against France and Sweden, in which he was played as a starter. He returned for two friendlies against Ireland (where he entered in the second half) and Chile (from the onset), a 3–1 win.

Style of play
Able to play as a defensive midfielder, he grew up playing mainly as a central defender. He is agile for his considerable height (193 cm), combined with a predisposition for the air and marking opponents. At home he has been repeatedly compared to Nemanja Vidić.

Career statistics

Club
As of match played 22 May 2022.

International

Honours

Club
Red Star Belgrade
Serbian Cup: 2011–12

Torino
Trofeo Città di Mondovì: 2013, 2014, 2015
Eusébio Cup: 2016

Napoli
Coppa Italia: 2019–20

Individual
Serbian SuperLiga Team of the Year: 2011–12

References

External links
 Profile at utakmica.rs
 

1991 births
Living people
People from Bajina Bašta
Association football defenders
Serbian footballers
Serbia international footballers
Serbia under-21 international footballers
Serbian expatriate footballers
FK Sevojno players
FK Sloboda Užice players
Red Star Belgrade footballers
Torino F.C. players
FC Spartak Moscow players
Serbian SuperLiga players
Serie A players
Expatriate footballers in Italy
Serbian expatriate sportspeople in Italy
S.S.C. Napoli players
Genoa C.F.C. players
Expatriate footballers in Russia
Russian Premier League players